Robert Lindsey (born January 4, 1935) is a journalist and author of several true crime books, including The Falcon and the Snowman: A True Story of Friendship and Espionage (1979) and A Gathering of Saints: A True Story of Money, Murder and Deceit (1988).

Background
Lindsey was born in Glendale, California, in 1935 and raised in Inglewood. In the 1950s, Lindsey attended San Jose State College with the dream of majoring in Journalism. He eventually received a Bachelor's Degree in History from San Jose State College in 1956. Upon graduation he began working at the San Jose Mercury-News as a reporter. In the 1970s, Lindsey relocated to Los Angeles and became the Los Angeles bureau chief for The New York Times.

Writing

The Falcon and the Snowman
In 1977, Lindsey began chronicling the story of Christopher John Boyce and Andrew Daulton Lee, who were both convicted of selling information to the Soviets. The Falcon and the Snowman was eventually published in 1979 and in 1980 he received the Edgar Allan Poe Award for best non-fiction crime book. In 1983, the sequel, The Flight of the Falcon: The True Story of the Escape and Manhunt for America's Most Wanted Spy, was released; it chronicled Boyce's escape from federal prison and subsequent bank robbing spree. The Falcon and the Snowman was optioned for a film and was subsequently made into a film of the same name, released in January 1985.

A Gathering of Saints
Lindsey's third non-fiction book was A Gathering of Saints: A True Story of Money, Murder and Deceit released in 1988. The book tells the story of a series of incidents involving document forger Mark Hofmann and the Church of Jesus Christ of Latter-day Saints (LDS Church). During the early 1980s, Hofmann, an LDS document dealer, began to uncover a series of potentially damaging documents implying that Joseph Smith, far from being the angelically inspired founder of a church, was in fact a diviner led to a cache of gold by a spirit that took the form of a white salamander. These documents were in actuality forgeries made by Hofmann, but the quality was such that it took some intensive detective work to uncover this, even after a number of document experts had found them to be "genuine". Lindsey won the 1989 CWA Gold Dagger for Non-Fiction for this book.

Other works
Marlon Brando and Ronald Reagan utilized Lindsey as a ghostwriter in writing their memoirs; respectively, Brando: Songs My Mother Taught Me, and Ronald Reagan: An American Life. Lindsey's own memoir, Ghost Scribbler, was published in 2012.

Books 
 The Falcon and the Snowman: A True Story of Friendship and Espionage, Robert Lindsey (Simon & Schuster; 1979) 
 The Flight of the Falcon, Robert Lindsey (Simon & Schuster; 1983) 
 A Gathering of Saints: A True Story of Money, Murder and Deceit, Robert Lindsey (Simon & Schuster; 1988) 
 Ronald Reagan: An American Life, Ronald Reagan (with Robert Lindsey) (Simon & Schuster; 1990) 
 Irresistible Impulse: A True Story of Blood and Money, Robert Lindsey (Simon & Schuster; 1992) 
 Songs My Mother Taught Me, Marlon Brando (with Robert Lindsey) (Random House; 1994) 
 Ghost Scribbler: Searching for Reagan, Brando and the King of Pop, Robert Lindsey (CreateSpace; 2012)

References

1935 births
20th-century American journalists
American male journalists
Living people
The Mercury News people